Natalie Morales (born February 15, 1985) is an American actress and director. She starred in the 2008 ABC Family series The Middleman and had a main role in 2009 on the first season of the USA Network series White Collar. In 2010, she appeared in the feature films Wall Street: Money Never Sleeps and Going the Distance. Morales also had a starring role in the Fox comedy series The Grinder, the NBC sitcom Abby's, and recurring roles in the NBC sitcom Parks and Recreation, HBO's The Newsroom and the Netflix series Dead to Me.

Her directorial debut film, the teen comedy Plan B, was released May 28, 2021, on Hulu. She also directed Language Lessons, a film she co-wrote with Mark Duplass and stars in.  It premiered at the Berlin International Film Festival and was released in September 2021.

Early life
A native of Miami, Florida, Morales is of Cuban descent. She attended St. Agatha Catholic School and Southwest Miami Senior High School. She participated in the University of Miami's Dow Jones Minority High School Journalism Workshop.

Career

Acting
Morales had a guest appearance on CSI: Miami in 2006, and played a character in Pimp My Ride that year, a video game version of the MTV television series. Her first major role was in The Middleman, a sci-fi dramedy which aired on the ABC Family network for one season. She starred as Wendy Watson; the series was adapted from the comic book, The Middleman. Morales also starred in and executive produced a Web series, titled Quitters. The series was an official selection of the 3rd annual ITVFest (Independent Television Festival) in Los Angeles in August 2008.

In 2009, Morales joined the cast of the USA Network television series White Collar for the first season. She portrayed Lauren Cruz, a junior FBI agent. In May 2010, after her dismissal from the White Collar cast, Morales began appearing as a regular in the NBC sitcom Parks and Recreation, appearing as Lucy, girlfriend of Aziz Ansari's character Tom Haverford and bartender at  The Snakehole Lounge. Morales appeared in Oliver Stone's 2010 film, Wall Street: Money Never Sleeps, a sequel to his 1987 film Wall Street. She was cast as Chelsea Handler's best friend in Are You There, Chelsea? She left the series when the cast was replaced for creative reasons. Morales also appeared on Aaron Sorkin's HBO drama, The Newsroom, guest-starring as Kaylee, the girlfriend of Dev Patel’s character, Neal. In 2013, Morales joined the cast of Trophy Wife as Meg, Kate's best friend. In 2015, she joined the cast of the Fox series The Grinder. In 2017, she appeared in some episodes of the NBC series Powerless. Morales appeared as Detective Anne Garcia in the Netflix horror comedy series Santa Clarita Diet.

Morales's most recent television series is the NBC multi-camera sitcom Abby's, created by Josh Malmuth and executive produced by Parks and Recreation creator Michael Schur. Their third series for the network, it premiered on March 28, 2019. Later that year, Morales was cast as Michelle in the second season of the Netflix black comedy series Dead to Me (2019).

Directing
In 2021, Morales directed teen comedy Plan B starring Victoria Moroles and Kuhoo Verma. The story revolves around two teens looking for the plan b pill after a night of a regrettable first sexual encounter. The film earned critical acclaim with critics praising Morales' direction including Linda Holmes of NPR who wrote, "The creators and the cast deserve enormous credit for how deftly the broader comedy here is balanced with genuine fear and frustration, and how unexpectedly parts of the film unfold. A lot of it is somehow structurally familiar but specifically surprising."

That same year she also directed the drama film Language Lessons (2021) which she co-wrote with writer-director Mark Duplass. They both star in the feature, which they filmed during the COVID-19 pandemic. The film is set over Zoom as a Spanish teacher (Morales) communicates with her student (Duplass). Katie Erbland, critic of IndieWire praised Morales' work on the film writing "Morales’ winning Language Lessons offers one of the best uses of the format yet, a 'Zoom film' that utilizes its constraints to craft an intimate, expressive two-hander, no fatigue in sight". The film had its debut at the 71st Berlin International Film Festival in March 2021 to positive reviews, and was released in September 2021.

Personal life
On June 30, 2017, Morales stated on social media that she identifies as queer. Morales uses she/they pronouns.

Filmography

References

External links

 
 Natalie Morales on Instagram

1985 births
Actresses from Miami
American entertainers of Cuban descent
American film actresses
American television actresses
Hispanic and Latino American actresses
Living people
LGBT Hispanic and Latino American people
LGBT people from Florida
American queer actresses
Queer women
21st-century American actresses
People from Kendall, Florida